Joanne McNeil is an American writer, editor, and art critic known for her personal essays on technology. She has written a book on internet culture.

McNeil founded and edited the now-defunct blog, The Tomorrow Museum, before becoming the editor of Rhizome at the New Museum, in 2011. She held the position through 2012, when She edited The Best of Rhizome 2012, published through LINK Editions/LINK Center for the Arts. She has contributed to Frieze, Los Angeles Times, Wired, and the Boston Globe. She currently maintains a column called Speculations for Filmmaker Magazine.

McNeil was part of two panels on the New Aesthetic: one called "The New Aesthetic" at SXSW 2012 and a follow-up called "Stories from the New Aesthetic" at the New Museum. McNeil was an Eyebeam resident. In 2015, McNeil was the inaugural recipient of the Thoma Foundation Digital Arts Writing Award for an emerging arts writer who has made significant contributions to the intersection of art and technology.

Books
Lurking: How a Person Became a User (2020)

References

External links
 Personal site
Internet of Dreams blog
 Rhizome archive
 Stories from the New Aesthetic video
 We Are New York Tech interview

American art critics
American technology journalists
American women journalists
Living people
American women critics
Year of birth missing (living people)
21st-century American women